Jacob Peterson (born January 27, 1986) is an American former professional soccer player who last played with Atlanta United FC in Major League Soccer.

Career

College and amateur
Peterson played youth soccer for local powerhouse Michigan Wolves, whom he led to four state championships, two midwest regional championships, and a third-place finish at the nationals, He played college soccer at Indiana University for three years from 2003 to 2005 where he scored 30 goals in 71 appearances. He also spent two seasons in the USL Premier Development League, playing for Michigan Bucks in 2004 and Kalamazoo Kingdom in 2005.

Professional
Peterson was drafted in the second round, 21st overall, of the 2006 MLS SuperDraft by Colorado Rapids. He was a major part of the Rapids midfield from 2006 to 2009, amassing over 100 appearances for the club in all competitions.

In January 2010, Peterson was traded to Toronto FC in exchange for allocation money. He made his debut for the club as a sub against Philadelphia Union April 15, 2010. Peterson scored his first goal for Toronto in the CONCACAF Champions League group stage versusReal Salt Lake in a 1–1 home draw on September 28. On October 16, Peterson scored his first league goal for Toronto in a 2–2 home draw with Columbus. After a disappointing first half of 2011, Peterson was traded along with Alan Gordon and Nana Attakora to San Jose Earthquakes for Ryan Johnson, allocation money, and an international roster spot.

Peterson remained with San Jose through the 2011 season. At season's end, the club declined his 2012 contract option, and he entered the 2011 MLS Re-Entry Draft. Peterson was not selected in the draft and became a free agent.

Sporting Kansas City signed Peterson ahead of the 2012 season. He would play five seasons with Sporting KC and was part of the 2013 MLS Cup winners and two Lamar Hunt U.S. Open Cup-winning squads. During his time with Sporting, he became known for his hard work and versatility, garnering the nickname "The Answer" for his ability to fill in at multiple positions.

A free agent after the 2016 season, Peterson signed with expansion Atlanta United for 2017. He scored 3 goals in 10 appearances for the Five Stripes before being waived by the club on January 29, 2018. In 2020 he returned to Sporting Kansas City as part of the club's broadcast team.

Honors

Indiana University
NCAA Men's Division I Soccer Championship (2): 2004

Toronto FC
Canadian Championship (2): 2010, 2011

Sporting Kansas City
Major League Soccer Eastern Conference Regular Season Championship (1): 2012
 Lamar Hunt U.S. Open Cup: 2012, 2015
 MLS Cup: 2013

References

External links
 

1986 births
Living people
American expatriate soccer players
American expatriate sportspeople in Canada
American soccer players
Association football forwards
Association football wingers
Atlanta United FC players
Colorado Rapids draft picks
Colorado Rapids players
Expatriate soccer players in Canada
Indiana Hoosiers men's soccer players
Kalamazoo Kingdom players
Major League Soccer players
NCAA Division I Men's Soccer Tournament Most Outstanding Player winners
Flint City Bucks players
Parade High School All-Americans (boys' soccer)
People from Portage, Michigan
San Jose Earthquakes players
Soccer players from Michigan
Sporting Kansas City players
Toronto FC players
United States men's under-20 international soccer players
United States men's youth international soccer players
USL League Two players